Radio Plus may refer to:

Radio Plus (Belgium)
Radio Plus (Coventry)
Radio Plus (Mauritius)
Radio Plus (Poland)